T1000 may refer to
 T1000, the Rolls-Royce Trent 1000 jet engine.
 T-1000, a fictional cyborg in the movie Terminator 2: Judgment Day.
 T-1001, a fictional cyborg in the TV show Terminator: The Sarah Connor Chronicles.
 OS T1000, a train used on the Oslo Metro.
 T-1000 truck, a truck manufactured by Kenworth.
 Pontiac T1000, an automobile also known as the Chevrolet Chevette.
 SNCF Class T 1000, a French train class predecessor of the SNCF Class T 2000.
 Sun Fire T1000, a computer server system.
 Telebit T1000, a model of modem.
 Toshiba T1000, a laptop computer.
 T 1000, a transistor radio manufactured by the German Braun company.
 a type of carbon fiber material.